INS Cheetah is a  of the Indian Navy.

History
Built at the Gdańsk Shipyard in Poland, INS Cheetah was commissioned in 30 November 1984

References

Kumbhir-class tank landing ships
1985 ships
Ships built in Gdańsk
Naval ships built in Poland for export